Hayways, formerly known as Fly Armenia Airways, is an Armenian airline headquartered in Yerevan and based at Zvartnots International Airport.

History
The airline was founded as Fly Armenia Airways, and received an Air Operator's Certificate in July 2020. It announced it would operate passenger flights to nine destinations in Europe and the Middle East, including Prague, Damascus and Tel Aviv as well as an unspecified network of long-haul freight operations. However neither these scheduled flights nor the announced aircraft fleet materialized.

Hayways had subsequently begun performing cargo-only flights to Moscow's Zhukovsky International Airport in light of the COVID-19 pandemic. 

As of November 2022, the airline does not have any aircraft in its fleet, neither is its website working.

Destinations

Fleet
As of November 2022, Hayways' does not maintain any aircraft - its former fleet consisted of the following aircraft:

See also
 Transport in Armenia
 List of airports in Armenia
 List of the busiest airports in Armenia

References

External links
 

Airlines of Armenia
Airlines established in 2019
Armenian brands
Transport in Yerevan
Armenian companies established in 2019